Trauma Towers, formerly The Haunted Hotel, was a themed funhouse,haunted attraction based at Blackpool Pleasure Beach in the North of the United Kingdom.

The attraction opened in 1980 as a walk-through, themed as a derelict hotel taking visitors through several haunted rooms. The outside of the hotel was painted blue and ramshackle with animations behind windows. In 1999, the attraction was renamed Trauma Towers and joined with the neighboring Tagada flat ride, which became the 'Baronial Dining Hall' and served as a finale.

The area outside Trauma Towers included gargoyles, ornate stone benches and a fountain with blood-red water. This area was later taken over by the dancing fountains show.

In 2009, the attraction was closed and left standing but not operating. One of the reasons for its discontinuation was purportedly due to the building becoming damp from the new adjacent Dancing Water Show. Some of the scenes were reused in the Ghost Train ride. The old entrance was re-used as a photographic portrait studio after the closure. In January 2018, the entire building was demolished at the same time as the Wild Mouse roller coaster, to make way for "future developments".

Walk-through
The attraction was changed several times over its lifetime, with much of the original 1980s design having become altered and more generic scenes added. In the time it was known as 'Trauma Towers', the walk-through scenes were as following:

Lobby - Where the famous animatronic known as the 'Hotel Manager', a disheveled man with black hair, white gloves and a toothbrush moustache with a demonic, ongoing laugh would allow guests into the hotel via an old fashioned check-in, with wood panelling, classic paintings and antlers and photos on the wall, including humorous wanted ads and signs, as well as keys hanging on the wall behind the reception.
Garden Room - A dimly lit room overgrown with plants, some of which would swipe out at guests' ankles as they passed.
Lounge - A room which had a heavily slanted floor.
Dark Corridor - With some textured floors and a plank-walk across some bubbling water.
Crypt - With a sudden tilting floor by a broken and empty stone coffin behind railings, although sometimes the coffin contained a skeleton.
Furnace Room - A large furnace dominated one corner, chains dangled from above, and a bound female body sat in a tin bath by the furnace, her head concealed within a tied sack.
Staircase - Leading upwards, with a large werewolf head mounted on the wall above.
Bedroom - In which guests saw a pale and dirty but otherwise normal looking man in bed, a vampirical ghost was hovering in the corner of the room; sometimes, this ghost would be holding a brain, the man was attempting to warn the ghost away with a crucifix.
Games Corridor - In which guests saw several ghouls playing Pool with a floating ball, the ghoul gags included the Cryptkeeper and a ghoul with a spinning head, as well as Vampire children with glowing eyes.
Balcony - A sponge-floor enclosed walkway with a window on one side, through which guests could see down over the Lobby. This corridor had a false end using mirrors to give the effect of more doors in a longer corridor ahead.
Dressing Room - Involving the classic gag of a beauty looking in the mirror, to see herself transform to a ghoul.
Library - With some slanting floors, books slid in and out, a fireplace flickered, some wall decorations moved about, a large gargoyle with red eyes dominated a corner of the room. Also in this room, a false door arch threatened to drop on guests, there was seating in two corners and occasionally 'bellboy' staff members hid in this room to scare guests.
Bathroom - A bathroom with a flickering light only allowed a brief glimpse into a filthy bathroom with a blocked-up toilet, broken sink and overflowing bathtub, in which a female figure appeared to be submerged and drowned.
Organ Corridor - A corridor with doors (meant to be hotel rooms) on one side whereas on the left-hand side an animatronic of a phantom playing an organ could be seen in black-light. This was also the waiting area for the "Baronial Dining Hall", in which a recording played advising pregnant women and people with back problems and heart disorders to pass through the hall via another path.
The Baronial Dining Hall - a large room containing a Tagada ride and heavily themed to an old banquet hall, which was complete with a large laid out table in the centre of the ride. It also had artwork, suits of armour, statues, flags, chandeliers and furniture around the room.

The Baronial Dining Hall
Once seated around the table, the lights would go out and footsteps would be heard moving across the room. A breathy noise would be heard as a shot of air was blown behind the necks of guests. Above, guests would see a demon figure in the ceiling with flashing lights, as the lights went out, guests would hear flapping noises and the demon was then shown on the other side of the room in the ceiling, again with flashing lights. As the lights went out, a louder roar was heard, a crunch and a scream, at which point a small amount of water was released from the ceiling over guests, to imitate a demon spitting on diners.

The chandelier lights would then light again and the ride then spun very fast in one direction as the orchestral score played and a pneumatic occasionally made one half of the "bowl" shoot upwards and down again.

Upon the ride ending, guests would leave via two double doors on the other side of the Baronial Dining Hall, which led outside to the front of the attraction.

The Tagada was a Soriani & Moser tagada which the park bought as new in 1987. In 2010, travelling showman and attractions fabricator Walter Murphy bought it from the park and converted it to a travelling machine before selling it on to Stewart Robinson who still owns and travels it, mainly in the Yorkshire section.

References

Haunted attractions (simulated)
Blackpool Pleasure Beach
Animatronic attractions